Werner Jablonski (born 26 June 1938) is a retired German footballer.

Career

Statistics

1 1964–65 includes the Verbandsliga Westfalen promotion playoffs. 1969–70 and 1970–71 include the Regionalliga promotion playoffs.

References

External links
 

1938 births
Living people
German footballers
Bundesliga players
VfL Bochum players

Association football midfielders